Ignasi Terraza (born 14 July 1962) is a Spanish jazz pianist.

Terraza was born in Barcelona, Catalonia, Spain. Blind from the age of 10, he studied for a degree in Computer Engineering, and after three years dividing his time between his profession and music, he decided to dedicate himself entirely to jazz in 1983, accompanying vocalists such as Kalil Wilson, Charmin Michelle, Randy Greer, Michelle McCain, Lavelle or Stacey Kent, and jazz musicians Frank Wess, Jesse Davis, Gene "The Mighty Flea" Conners, Teddy Edwards, Ted Curson, Spike Robinson, Ralph Lalama or Brad Leali.

As a leader, his trios and quartets have included bassists Pierre Boussaguet, Mario Rossy, Javier Colina, Jules Bekoko and Horacio Fumero, among others, and Jean Pierre Derouard, Gregory Hutchinson, Walter Perkins, Bobby Durham, Peer Wyboris, Jo Krause, Esteve Pi or Julian Vaughn on drums.

One particular association, divided into two stints (1985–1988 and 1996–2000), was with vibraphonist and drummer Oriol Bordas, playing in trio/quartet formations and with the Barcelona Jazz Orchestra.

Since 2003 he has been teaching jazz piano at the Higher School of Music of Catalonia – Escola Superior de Música de Catalunya. Since 2006, his trio has accompanied singer Susana Sheiman at venues in both Madrid and Barcelona. Since 2006 he has also featured in several public appearances of the Sant Andreu Jazz Band, a big band founded by Joan Chamorro in Barcelona and formed by multi-instrumentalists such as Andrea Motis, Rita Payés and many others.

His 2009 recording, Plaça Vella (2009), with the Josep Maria Farràs & Ignasi Terraza Trio features two tracks with saxophonist Jesse Davis.

In 2013, he premiered his Suit Miró at Washington's National Gallery of Art on the occasion of that museum's monographic exhibition on the Catalan artist Joan Miró and the following year performed the same suite at Madrid's Museo Reina Sofía on the occasion of International Museum Day.

Awards 
From 1990 to 1993, he co-led, with US guitarist David Mitchell, the Mitchell-Terraza Quartet, winning the "best new group" award at the 1991 Festival Internacional de Jazz de Guetxo.

Terraza won the 2009 Jacksonville Jazz Piano Competition.

Discography 
Festival Internacional de Jazz de Getxo (1991) - Mitchell-Terraza Quartet
Shell Blues (1993) - Mitchell-Terraza Quartet
Miaow! (1995) - Four Kats Jazz Quartet
The Voice - The Romance of Jazz (1996) - Randy Greer
Let Me Tell You Something (1999) - Ignasi Terraza Trio
Jazz a les Fosques/Jazz en la oscuridad (1999) - Ignasi Terraza Trio
September in the Rain (1999) - Barcelona Jazz Orchestra
Night Sounds (2000) - Toni Solá & Ignasi Terraza Trio
Christmas Swings in Barcelona (2003) - Randy Greer & Ignasi Terraza Trio
IT’s Coming (2004)
Confessin’ (2004) Oriol Romaní & Ignasi Terraza 
In a Sentimental Groove (2005) - Ignasi Terraza Trio
Plaça Vella (2009) - Josep Maria Farràs & Ignasi Terraza Trio
Suit Miró (2013) - Ignasi Terraza Trio

References

External links 
Spanish-language Jazz biographies

1962 births
Living people
Musicians from Barcelona
Jazz pianists from Catalonia
Musicians from Catalonia
Blind musicians
21st-century pianists